Urotensin II-related peptide (URP) is a cyclic neuropeptide that is found in all vertebrates that have been genome sequenced so far. It has a long lasting hypotensive effect and may also regulate reproduction. It is part of the Urotensin II system and is one of the two endogenous ligands for rats, mice, and possibly humans.

Discovery 
URP was discovered in rats when researchers were trying to locate urotensin II (UII), a neuropeptide that is a potent vasoconstrictor and increases REM cycles in the brain. The researchers designed antibodies using Goby UII as an antigen that would target the specific peptide sequence CFWKYC. When the peptide was observed using a mass spectrometer the scientists discovered this peptide was smaller than UII but had similar characteristics as well which is why it was called Urotensin II-related peptide.

Structure 
The URP gene is located on the 3q28 chromosome of humans. The mature URP peptide is only 8 peptides long making it smaller than UII. URP is also the same across all vertebrates because it has the same cleaving site unlike UII whose cleaving sites vary among species making its sequence different for all species. URP has the same cysteine bridged hexapeptide ring with the sequence CFWKYC as UII. This is known as the core and is the major site of action on the peptide. Destruction of the core leads to immediate loss of biological activity. On the other hand, the amino terminus of URP doesn’t seem to contain any relevant information because it can be modified without any loss in pharmacological activity. Unlike UII, URP doesn’t have an acidic amino acid (either glutamic acid or aspartic acid) preceding its core. It is still a potent agonist for the UII- receptor which suggests that this acidic amino acid is not required for activation of the receptor.

The peptide sequence for URP is:

Alanine-Cysteine-Phenylalanine-Tryptophan-Lysine-Tyrosine-Cysteine-Valine

Receptor 
URP is an agonist for the UII receptor which is a G protein-coupled receptor with the alpha subunit Gαq11. This activates PKC which then activates PLC which increases the intercellular calcium concentration. It is found in many peripheral tissues, blood vessels, and also the brainstem cholinergic neurons of the laterodorsal tegmental (LDT) and the pedunculopontine tegmental nuclei (PPT).

Tissue Localization 
Prepro-URP which is the precursor to the mature URP peptide is found in various tissues including specific parts of the brain such as frontal lobe and hypothalamus, and other peripheral tissues such as heart, kidneys, lungs, placenta, ovaries, and testes. In humans the amount of UII and URP gene expression are comparable except in the spinal cord where UII gene expression is much higher.

In rats the UII gene expression is higher than the URP gene expression throughout the entire body. However, when the brains of the rats were tested, only the URP peptide was found making it the primary endogenous ligand in the brain.

Unlike humans and rats, URP gene expression is found in mice spinal cords.

Function

Cardiovascular 
When URP is injected into rats a long hypotensive response will be observed. UII is known as a vasoconstrictor meaning that even though both are agonists for the same receptor they can produce opposite effects

CNS 
Axons that react to URP are primarily found in organum vasculosum laminae terminalis (OVLT) and in the median eminence (ME). These axons are located near the hypothalamus and almost always contain the hormone Gondotropin- releasing hormone (GnRH) which was found through in situ hybridization which provides information of the anatomical location URP mRNA. This means that URP might have an effect on reproduction which has not been discovered .

Binding between UII and URP 
Since they are both ligands for the same receptor, an experiment was done to determine which ligand had a higher affinity. When the binding of the two were compared and tested, URP actually had higher affinity.

References

Further reading 
 
 

Neuropeptides